'All-out' elections to the Wigan Council were held on 1 May 1980, following extensive boundary changes and entirely new wards, yet retaining the number of 24 wards with three seats each for a total of 72 seats. The results were comparable to the 1973 election (also an election where all 72 seats were up for vote), with Labour rewarded a crushing majority in seats for approaching 60% of the vote with their main competitors, the Conservatives, falling to under 30%. The Liberals seen their highest representation yet by way of winning all three seats in Langtree.

A former Labour councillor who'd represented the just-abolished ward 19 (encompassing central/north Hindley) since the council's creation fought the Hindley ward as an Independent Labour. Overall turnout fell to the slightly higher than usual number of 36.2% from the general election turnout of 75.7% last year, with all wards recording at least one competitor - although that meant in a number of wards Labour were unopposed for one or two of the seats.

Election result

This result had the following consequences for the total number of seats on the Council after the elections:

Ward results

References

1980 English local elections
1980
1980s in Greater Manchester